Nicholas Martin Limer Barnes (18 January 1939 – 5 February 2022) was a British civil engineer and project manager noted for his role in the development of the New Engineering Contract (NEC), and a founding member and longest-serving president (from 2003 to 2012) of the Association for Project Management (APM). He served also as the chair of the APM from 1986 to 1991, and was named an Honorary Fellow in 1995.

Life and career
Born on 18 January 1939, Barnes earned a civil engineering degree from the University of London and a PhD from the University of Manchester in 1971. His doctorate was awarded for research into improved methods of financial control for engineering projects. In the same year, shortly after completing his doctorate, he set up his own project management business, which merged in 1985 with what is now PricewaterhouseCoopers. Later, he worked as a consultant in project management. He was active from 1972 onwards in the International Project Management Association (IPMA), where he was a Fellow, board member and chairman of its Council of Representatives, and one of the creators of the original Civil Engineering Standard Method of Measurement (CESMM), which was published in 1976.

From 2008 he chaired an independent dispute avoidance panel set up to avert contractual disputes on work to build facilities for the 2012 London Olympic Games.

Barnes died on 5 February 2022, at the age of 83.

Achievements

Barnes' contribution to the civil engineering profession is considered immense, especially for his invention of the classic Time/Cost/Quality triangle – known variously as the project management triangle, Iron Triangle or 'Barnes Triangle'. He himself considered that "this was a very significant step in the establishment of modern project management and my triangle diagram came to be used all over the world".

The triangle emphasises "the importance of managing 'quality' besides time and cost". Speaking to APM’s journal, Project, in 2012, Barnes said of the triangle that he "really didn’t know just how important it would become". He stated that he created it because, when he was first running projects, "they weren't even referred to as projects. You had cost engineers to look after the money, planning engineers to look after the time and nobody was really looking after the value or quality of what was actually being produced. Nobody was in charge of making sure that the end product was the useful or valuable thing that the client wanted." In a later publication, Barnes referred to the triangle as "the triangle of objectives".

However, the project management triangle is considered insufficient by some writers as a model of project success, because it omits crucial dimensions of success including impact on stakeholders, learning, and user satisfaction. Subsequently, several enhancements of the basic triple constraints have been proposed such as the diamond framework, the pyramid model, six or multiple constraints and the theory of constraints.

The APM's posthumous tribute to Barnes observed that he "had always been at the forefront of the development of project management and had worked relentlessly to ensure that it became a fully recognised profession". The testimony of the APM is that he "changed the landscape of project management forever".

Peter Higgins, Chair of the NEC Contract Board, recalls that he was "immediately struck by Martin’s depth of knowledge and commitment to developing a better way of contracting – through collaboration".

The former "NEC awards", awarded in 7 categories which aim to "recognise excellence in project delivery and showcase examples of good practice through collaboration from across the world", were renamed as the "Martin Barnes Awards" in 2022.

References

1939 births
2022 deaths
Alumni of the University of London
Alumni of the University of Manchester
English civil engineers
Project management